Chotrana, is a Tunisian village dependent on the municipality of La Soukra, in the governorate of Arianah.

History 
From the end of the 1970s, new inhabitants settled there from various regions of the country. Chotrana also has many emigrants who have built a second home in which they stay during the summer or after retirement.

See also 

 La Soukra
 Ariana

References

External links 

Ariana Governorate
Communes of Tunisia